This is the discography for American jazz musician Dave Douglas.

As leader

As sidemusician

References 

Discographies of American artists
Jazz discographies